The 2018 Veikkausliiga was the 88th season of top-tier football in Finland. HJK were the defending champions.

Fixtures for the 2018 season were announced on 17 January 2017. The season started on 7 April 2018 and ended on 27 October 2018.

Teams
JJK were relegated to Ykkönen after finishing at the bottom of the 2017 season. Their place was taken by Ykkönen champions TPS.

HIFK as 11th-placed team lost their Veikkausliiga spot after losing to second-placed Ykkönen team FC Honka in a relegation/promotion playoff.

Stadia and locations

Personnel and kits

Managerial changes

League table

Results
Each team plays three times against every other team, either twice at home and once away or once at home and twice away, for a total of 33 matches played each.

Matches 1–22

Matches 23–33

Season statistics

Top scorers

Awards

Annual awards

Team of the Year

References

Veikkausliiga seasons
Fin
Fin
1
|}